The 1921–22 Eintracht Frankfurt season was the 22nd season in the club's football history.

In 1921–22 the club played in the Kreisliga Nordmain, the top tier of German football. It was the club's 3rd season in the Kreisliga Nordmain.

The season ended up with Eintracht winning Kreisliga Nordmain for the third time in a row. In the Nordmain decider match didn't qualify for the South German championship.

Matches

Legend

Friendlies

Kreisliga Nordmain

League fixtures and results

League table

Results summary

Results by round

South German championship round (Northern section)

Fixtures and results

South German Cup DFB-Pokal / SFV-Pokal

Squad

Squad and statistics

|}

Transfers

In:

Out:

See also
 1922 German football championship

Notes

Sources

External links
 Official English Eintracht website 
 German archive site 

1921-22
German football clubs 1921–22 season